Frederick "Eric" Altamirano (born August 8, 1966 in Davao City) is a former Filipino basketball player and he formerly the assistant coach of the Alaska Aces. In the present he is the commissioner of Chooks-to-Go Pilipinas 3x3
He was part of the Philippine national team that played at the 1986 Asian Games. He is the former head coach of the National University Bulldogs from 2011 to 2016.

Playing career

Varsity
Eric went to San Beda College for his high school education. He was a member of the Red Cubs, the school's varsity basketball team and was one of the players who were instrumental in giving the school a string of championships.

College / Amateur
He played college ball for the University of the Philippines in the University Athletic Association of the Philippines, Eric gained prominence in College when in 1986, together with Ronnie Magsanoc and Benjie Paras, they led the UP Maroons to its first UAAP crown after 47 years and the team's first post-war title since the NCAA days. He was named the Most Valuable Player that same year.

Altamirano was a member of the Philippine national team that took home the bronze medal at the 1986 Asian Games in Seoul, the nationals were mentored by his UP coach Joe Lipa. He played for YCO Shine Masters in the PABL.

Professional
Altamirano was signed as a rookie free agent by Alaska in 1989. He wasn't really able to prove his worth in the pros, playing back-up to the starting point guard of his team. He also played for Pepsi and Shell. 

He is now the Program Director for the National Basketball Training Center, a grassroots program for Philippine Basketball. In 2004, he also created the Coach E Basketball School.

Coaching career

Collegiate coach
Altamirano ventured into coaching after retiring from playing. His first try was in 1996 when he led the University of the Philippines to a Final Four finish. He was the head coach of the National University Bulldogs from 2011 to 2016. He steered the Bulldogs when the team won their first UAAP men's basketball championship after 60 years in Season 77 men's basketball finals in 2014.

After an unsatisfactory performance in Season 79, Altamirano and the rest of his coaching staff led by Vic Ycasiano, Joey Guanio, Paolo Layug, and Anton Altamirano filed their resignation. On December 7, the management of the NU Bulldogs accepted the resignation letter of Altamirano.

Pro League coach
Altamirano won two championships in the PBA. Before leading Purefoods to a PBA title in 1997, he was Chot Reyes' assistant coach at Purefoods in 1995 until 1996. After leading the Cowboys in the All-Filipino Conference, he moved to the Mobiline Phone Pals and gave them a championship, the 1998 PBA Centennial Cup. But after the 2000 PBA All-Filipino Cup, he was fired together with the whole coaching staff and replaced by Louie Alas. 

He returned to Purefoods and gave them a string of decent finishes. He left Purefoods, after being selected by Jong Uichico as the RP men's basketball team assistant coach. After 2 years of not coaching a PBA team, he coached the Coca-Cola Tigers during the 2005 PBA Fiesta Conference. Eventually, he was reassigned and appointed as the Project Director for the San Miguel All Stars.

3x3 team coach
Altamirano would oversee the Chooks-to-Go 3x3 teams which competed at the FIBA 3x3 Men's Pro Circuit for two years. He resigned from his post on November 2020 and was replaced by Aldin Ayo.

National team coach
He was the head coach of the Nokia Pilipinas Under 18 Men's basketball team. Handled  of the Nokia Pilipinas Men's National under-16 national basketball team of the Philippines, that placed 4th in the Fiba Asia U 16 Men's Tournament in Johor Bahru in November 2009., and Project Director  of the National Basketball Training Center of the Samahang Basketbol ng Pilipinas, the country's national basketball federation.

Coaching record

Collegiate record

PBA

References

1966 births
Living people
Alaska Aces (PBA) players
Asian Games bronze medalists for the Philippines
Asian Games medalists in basketball
Basketball players at the 1986 Asian Games
Filipino men's basketball coaches
Filipino men's basketball players
Medalists at the 1986 Asian Games
Magnolia Hotshots coaches
San Beda University alumni
Shell Turbo Chargers players
TNT Tropang Giga players
UP Fighting Maroons basketball players
Great Taste Coffee Makers draft picks
TNT Tropang Giga coaches
UP Fighting Maroons basketball coaches
NU Bulldogs basketball coaches